Friends of Labatt Park is a grassroots, non-profit (unincorporated) group of volunteers dedicated to "promoting and enhancing Labatt Park in London, Ontario, Canada, as the world's oldest baseball grounds in continuous use in its original location since 1877."

In this regard, "Friends" has a custodial fund set up with the City of London's treasurer whereby all donations of $25 or more will result in the donor being issued a tax-deductible receipt by the City of London.

Designating Labatt Park an historic site

The group was first formed in 1993 and was successful in convincing London's city council-of-the-day to designate the municipally owned ball park an historic site under Part IV of the Ontario Heritage Act in 1994 with a plaque unveiling on Canada Day—a ballpark which dates back to 1877 when it was called Tecumseh Park, before it was donated to the City of London by the Labatt Brewing Company on December 31, 1936.

Amending the park's reasons for designation

In 1996, the group was also successful in having the "reasons for designation" contained in the designating by-law of Labatt Park amended to include the 1937, cottage-style clubhouse, built after the Thames River Flood of April 26, 1937, for the London Majors and their opponents (subsequently renamed the Roy McKay Clubhouse in 1996) in the Intercounty Baseball League.

Since that time, the group has helped to raise money for a new cedar-shingle roof on the Roy McKay Clubhouse (via a fundraising ballgame on May 31, 1998, dubbed "The Rumble at the Riverforks"), facilitated the mounting of eight history-related plaques at the stadium, the planting of five indigenous trees and assisted in organizing numerous events at the park, including five annual Doors Open events, vintage base ball games and other special events where the "Friends" display historical photos and other baseball memorabilia related to the ballpark.

The "Friends" have also issued numerous media releases over the years, as well as liaising with the local, regional, national and international media about the history of the ballpark and its activities.

In 2006, the "Friends" were responsible for the inclusion of Labatt Park in a 16-month calendar published by American transportation carrier, Roadway Express, entitled "Times of Greatness 2007 calendar" featuring sites important to the history of the Negro leagues. Labatt Park is the only Canadian site featured in the calendar which has a print run of 150,000.

Intercounty Baseball Hall of Fame

In June 2006, the Intercounty Baseball League (IBL) unanimously endorsed establishing an IBL Hall of Fame at Labatt Park. The Friends of Labatt Park are assisting in this proposed initiative, which remains in the early stages of development.

On September 7, 2011, Baseball Canada announced that historic Labatt Memorial Park in London, Ontario, had won its six-week-long, favourite ballpark contest, winning the final round where it went head-to-head with Port Arthur Stadium in Thunder Bay, Ontario. During the two-week-long, final round of online voting, where more than 19,000 votes were cast, Labatt Park won with 63 per cent of the vote.

References
 Milky Way illuminates Labatt Park by James Reaney of The London Free Press, October 2005
 Thank goodness for friends like these by sportswriter Morris Dalla Costa of The London Free Press, 2002
 An Eight-Page Indenture/ Instrument #33043 between The London and Western Trusts Company Limited, The Corporation of The City of London and John Labatt, Limited, dated December 31, 1936, and registered on title in the Land Registry Office for the City of London on January 2, 1937, conveying Tecumseh Park to the City of London along with $10,000 on the provisos that the athletic field be preserved, maintained and operated in perpetuity "for the use of the citizens of the City of London as an athletic field and recreation ground" and that it be renamed "The John Labatt Memorial Athletic Park."

External links
 Virtual Tour of Labatt Park 
 Map: location of Labatt Park in London
Photo of the Roy McKay Clubhouse at Labatt Park
The Friends work to protect Roy McKay Clubhouse
 1876 and 1877 Bryce's Baseball Guides
 London Majors Web site
 Intercounty Baseball Official Site
 1920 London Tecumsehs
 City of London Web site
 Labatt Park Reunion 2005 Media Release
 Longtime London Major Norm Aldridge at Labatt Park wearing Viking Horns
 Friends' founder (Barry Wells) named to 2006 Mayor's New Year's Honours List for Heritage
 Stephen Harding, another member of "Friends" receives 2008 Mayor's New Year's Honours List for Heritage

Non-profit organizations based in Ontario
History of baseball in Canada
Baseball culture
Sport in London, Ontario
Baseball in Ontario
Organizations based in London, Ontario